Stadio Danilo Martelli is the main stadium in Mantua, Italy. It is named Danilo Martelli, a Mantuan footballer from the 1940s, who died in the Superga air disaster of 1949. It is currently used mostly for football matches and, on occasion, for concerts. It is the home of A.C. Mantova.

History
There is a plan to redevelop the site but it is put in ice due Mantova currently bottom division.

References

Danilo
Mantova 1911
Danilo Martelli